Şahinbey, historically and still informally called Körkün, is a village in the Oğuzeli District, Gaziantep Province, Turkey. The village is inhabited by Turkmens of various tribal affiliations, including the Barak tribe as well as Abdals of the Kara Hacılar tribe.

References

Villages in Oğuzeli District